L'Enchanteur ("the wizard") is a 1984 novel by the French writer René Barjavel. It tells the story of the Knights of the Round Table and the quest for the Holy Grail from the perspective of Merlin and his relationship with Viviane. Barjavel had studied the material on the Grail legend extensively. He added several new concepts to the backstory of the grail, placing its origin to the time of Adam and Eve. According to the novel, Eve used the cup to collect Adam's blood from the wound created when his rib was removed.

The novel was published in 1984 through éditions Denoël. The Arthurian Handbook (2nd ed., 1997) describes it as "among the best of the modern French adaptations of Arthurian legend".

See also
 Fiction featuring Merlin

References

External links
 Publicity page  at éditions Denoël's website

1984 French novels
Arthurian literature in French
French-language novels
Works based on Merlin
Modern Arthurian fiction
Novels by René Barjavel
Holy Grail in fiction